A sanatorium (from Latin sānāre 'to heal, make healthy'), also sanitarium or sanitorium, are antiquated names for specialised hospitals, for the treatment of specific diseases, related ailments and convalescence. Sanatoriums are often in a healthy climate, usually in the countryside. The idea of healing was an important reason for the historical wave of establishments of sanatoriums, especially at the end of the 19th- and early 20th centuries. One sought, for instance, the healing of consumptives, especially tuberculosis (before the discovery of antibiotics) or alcoholism, but also of more obscure addictions and longings of hysteria, masturbation, fatigue and emotional exhaustion. Facility operators were often charitable associations such as the Order of St. John and the newly founded social welfare insurance companies.

Sanatoriums should not be confused with the Russian sanatoriums from the time of the Soviet Union, which were a type of sanatorium resort residence for workers.

History

Conception
The first suggestion of sanatoria in the modern sense was likely made by George Bodington, who opened a sanatorium in Sutton Coldfield in 1836 and later published his essay "On the Treatment and Cure of Pulmonary Consumption" in 1840. His novel approach was dismissed as "very crude ideas and unsupported assertions" by reviewers in the Lancet, and his sanatorium was converted to an asylum soon after. The rationale for sanatoria in the pre-antibiotic era was that a regimen of rest and good nutrition offered the best chance that the patient's immune system would "wall off" pockets of pulmonary TB infection. In 1863, Hermann Brehmer opened the Brehmersche Heilanstalt für Lungenkranke in Görbersdorf (Sokołowsko), Silesia (now Poland), for the treatment of tuberculosis. Patients were exposed to plentiful amounts of high altitude, fresh air, and good nutrition. Tuberculosis sanatoria became common throughout Europe from the late-19th century onward.

Early establishments
The Adirondack Cottage Sanitarium, established in Saranac Lake, New York, in 1885, was the first such establishment in North America. According to the Saskatchewan Lung Association, when the National Anti-Tuberculosis Association (Canada) was founded in 1904, its members, including renowned pioneer in the fight against tuberculosis Dr. R.G. Ferguson, believed that a distinction should be made between the health resorts with which people were familiar and the new tuberculosis treatment hospitals: "So they decided to use a new word which instead of being derived from the Latin noun sanitas, meaning health, would emphasize the need for scientific healing or treatment. Accordingly, they took the Latin verb root sano, meaning to heal, and adopted the new word sanatorium."

Switzerland used to have many sanatoria, as health professionals believed that clean, cold mountain air was the best treatment for lung diseases. In Finland, a series of tuberculosis sanatoria were built throughout the country in isolated forest areas during the early 1900s. The most famous was the Paimio Sanatorium, completed in 1933 and designed by world-renowned architect Alvar Aalto. It had both sun-balconies and a rooftop terrace where the patients would lie all day either in beds or on specially designed chairs, the Paimio Chair.  In Portugal, the Heliantia Sanatorium in Valadares was used for the treatment of bone tuberculosis between the 1930s and 1960s.

In 20th-century United States

In the early 20th century, tuberculosis sanatoria became common in the United States. The first of several in Asheville, North Carolina was established by Dr. Horatio Page Gatchell in 1871, before the cause of tuberculosis (then called "phthisis" or "consumption") was even known. Fifty years earlier, Dr. J.F.E. Hardy had reportedly been cured in the "healing climate". Medical experts reported that at 2,200 feet (670 m) above sea level, air pressure was equal to that in blood vessels, and activities, scenery, and lack of stress also helped.  In the early 1900s, Arizona's sunshine and dry desert air attracted many people (called "lungers") who had tuberculosis, rheumatism, asthma, and numerous other diseases. Wealthier people chose to recuperate in exclusive TB resorts, while others used their savings to journey to Arizona and arrived penniless. TB camps in the desert were formed by pitching tents and building cabins. During the tuberculosis epidemic, cities in Arizona advertised the state as an ideal place for treating TB. Many sanatoria in Arizona were modeled after European away-from-city resorts of the time, boasting courtyards and individual rooms. Each sanatorium was equipped to take care of about 120 people.

The first sanatorium in the Pacific Northwest opened in Milwaukie Heights, Oregon, in 1905, followed closely by the first state-owned TB hospital in Salem, Oregon, in 1910. Oregon was the first state on the West Coast to enact legislation stating that the government was to supply proper housing for people with TB who could not receive adequate care at home. The West Coast became a popular spot for sanatoriums.

The greatest area for sanatoria was in Tucson with over 12 hotel-style facilities in the city. By 1920, Tucson had 7,000 people who had come for treatment of tuberculosis. So many people came to the West that not enough housing was available. In 1910, tent cities began to pop up in different areas; one was described as a place of squalor and shunned by most citizens. Many of the infected slept in the open desert. The area adjacent to what was then central Phoenix, called Sunnyslope, was home to another large TB encampment. The residents primarily lived in tents pitched along the hillsides of the mountains that rise to the north of the city. Several sanatoria also opened in southern California in the early 20th century due to the dry, warm climate.

The first tuberculosis sanatorium for blacks in the segregated South was the Piedmont Sanatorium in Burkeville, Virginia. Waverly Hills Sanatorium, a Louisville, Kentucky, tuberculosis sanatorium, was founded in 1911. It has become a mecca for curiosity seekers who believe it is haunted.  Because of its dry climate, Colorado Springs was home to several sanatoria.  A. G. Holley Hospital in Lantana, Florida, was the last remaining freestanding tuberculosis sanatorium in the United States until it closed on July 2, 2012.

In 1907, Stannington Sanatorium was opened in the North East of England to treat tuberculosis in children. The sanatorium was opened using funds raised by a local charity, the Poor Children's Holiday Association, now the region's oldest children's charity, Children North East. The largest U.S. tuberculosis sanatorium was located on the site of Chicago's present-day North Park Village. Chicago's Peterson Park fieldhouse housed the lab and morgue of Chicago's Municipal Tuberculosis Sanatorium.

Discovery of antibiotics and decline
After 1943, when Albert Schatz, then a graduate student at Rutgers University, discovered streptomycin, an antibiotic and the first cure for tuberculosis, sanatoria began to close. As in the case of the Paimio Sanatorium, many were transformed into general hospitals. By the 1950s, tuberculosis was no longer a major public health threat; it was controlled by antibiotics rather than extended rest. Most sanatoria had been demolished years before.

Some, however, have been adapted for new medical roles. The Tambaram Sanatorium in south India is now a hospital for AIDS patients. The state hospital in Sanatorium, Mississippi, is now a regional center for programs for treatment and occupational therapy associated with intellectual disability. In Japan in 2001, the ministry of welfare suggested changing the name of a leprosarium to a sanatorium.

In culture
The Magic Mountain, the 1924 novel by the German writer and social critic Thomas Mann, is set in a sanatorium.
The Austrian-American Jewish poet and artist Samuel Greenberg wrote three poems about his experiences in sanatoria, including "Wards Island Symphonique".
The American heavy metal band Metallica has the song "Welcome Home (Sanitarium)" on their 1986 Master of Puppets studio album, which had been in part inspired by One Flew Over the Cuckoo's Nest.

See also
Sanatorium (resort)
Battle Creek Sanitarium (Michigan, United States)
Leper colony 
List of sanatoria in the United States

References

Further reading
Waverly Hills Sanatorium still source of local curiosity, Douglas Kleier, Jr., Louisville Cardinal Online, Oct. 21, 2003.
 
Thomas Spees Carrington. Tuberculosis Hospital and Sanatorium Construction (New York, 1911).

External links

 
Bloomington's Kelso Sanitarium promised to cure all - Pantagraph (Bloomington, Illinois newspaper)

 
Destination resorts